Melissa "Missy" Hasin, (born November 3, 1954 in Hollywood, California) is an American cellist who was raised in Newport Beach, California.

Biography
Although her parents wanted her to stick with classical music, she played the electric bass in various blues and rock bands as a teenager but later concentrated mainly on the cello.  She earned a BA in music from California State University Long Beach in 1978.  Hasin considers Jaco Pastorius and John Patitucci as primary influences.

As a session musician, she has embraced everything from classical and rock/pop to heavy metal, soul, and rap.  She has played on sessions by everyone from Barbra Streisand and Natalie Cole to No Doubt (which used Hasin on its major hit of 1996 "Don't Speak"),  to gangsta rapper Snoop Dogg.  Other artists include Tori Amos, John Tesh, Bradley Joseph, Melissa Manchester, Kosmos Express, David Benoit, Robert Deeble and Teddy Edwards.  On stage, she has backed Sammy Davis, Jr., Smokey Robinson, Frank Sinatra in 1996, and Led Zeppelin graduates Robert Plant and Jimmy Page in 1997.

Discography
Cellistic Visions, Cexton Records
How My Heart Sings (1997), Cexton Records

References

External links
 

American cellists
American session musicians
California State University, Long Beach alumni
People from Hollywood, Los Angeles
Musicians from Newport Beach, California
Living people
1954 births
Women cellists
21st-century American violinists
21st-century American women musicians
21st-century cellists